Rusununguko may refer to:

 Sunungura Rusununguko (born 1978), American football player
 Rusununguko Secondary School, school in Shurugwi District, Zimbabwe